SM U-151 or SM Unterseeboot 151 ( ex U Oldenburg) was a World War I U-boat of the Imperial German Navy, constructed by Reiherstieg Schiffswerfte & Maschinenfabrik at Hamburg and launched on 4 April 1917. From 1917 until the Armistice in November 1918 she was part of the U-Kreuzer Flotilla, and was responsible for 34 ships sunk and 7 ships damaged (13,267 GRT and 1,025 tons).

Background
U-151 was originally one of seven  class U-boats designed to carry cargo between the United States and Germany in 1916. Five of the submarine freighters were converted into long-range cruiser U-boats (U-kreuzers) equipped with two  SK L/45 deck guns, including U-151 which was originally to have been named Oldenburg. The Type U 151 class were the largest U-boats of World War I.

Service history
U-151 was commissioned on 21 July 1917. From 21 July to 26 December 1917 she was commanded by Waldemar Kophamel who took U-151 on a long-range cruise which eventually covered a total of 12,000 miles. On 19 September 1917 U-151 claimed her first victim, the 3,104 GRT French sailing ship Blanche in the Atlantic Ocean. On 2 or 12 October 1917 (sources differ), she collided with the Royal Navy Q-ship  in the Atlantic Ocean off Casablanca, French Morocco, sinking Begonia. On 20 November 1917 U-151 captured the steamship Johan Mjelde, and scuttled her on 26 November after transferring 22 tons of her cargo of copper.

American cruise

U-151 left Kiel on 14 April 1918 commanded by Korvettenkapitän Heinrich von Nostitz und Jänckendorff, her mission to attack American shipping. She arrived off the United States East Coast on 21 May, laid mines off the Delaware Capes and cut the submerged telegraph cables which connected New York City with Nova Scotia. On 25 May she stopped three American schooners off Virginia, took their crews prisoner, and sank the three ships by gunfire.

On 2 June 1918, known to some historians as "Black Sunday", U-151 sank six American ships and damaged one off the coast of New Jersey in the space of a few hours. The next day the tanker Herbert L. Pratt struck a mine previously laid by U-151 in the area but was later salvaged.

On 9 June 1918, U-151 stopped the Norwegian cargo ship Vindeggen off Cape Hatteras, North Carolina. Scuttling charges were rigged aboard her, then she was escorted outside the shipping lane under a prize crew. Von Nostitz then transferred 70 tons of copper ingots from Vindeggen to U-151. On 14 June U-151 followed this with the sinking of the Norwegian barque Samoa, en route from Walvis Bay, South-West Africa, to Perth Amboy, New Jersey, with a cargo of copper ore, by gunfire s off the Virginia coast. There were no casualties. On 18 June, U-151 sank the steamship , and then loitered near Dwinsks lifeboats in the hopes that more Allied shipping would be attracted to them.  Through this ruse, she launched torpedoes at the U.S. Navy auxiliary cruiser and troopship , but missed and was instead depth charged by  Von Steuben. On 28 June, U-151 captured SS Dictator and made its crew prisoners of war. Among those taken were four men from Newfoundland.

Her commander reported that she had sunk 23 ships totalling 61,000 tons and had laid mines responsible for the sinking of another four vessels.

Fate
At the end of the war U-151 surrendered to France at Cherbourg. The French Navy sank her as a target on 7 June 1921.

Summary of raiding history

See also
 USS Von Steuben, one of the ships she unsuccessfully attacked in 1918.

Notes

Bibliography 
Notes

References

External links

  For a discussion of the impact of this boat on the U.S. submarine effort in WWI
 Photo, Herbert L. Pratt grounded after making way inshore.

German Type U 151 submarines
U-boats commissioned in 1917
Maritime incidents in 1917
Maritime incidents in 1921
U-boats sunk in 1921
World War I submarines of Germany
World War I shipwrecks in the English Channel
Ships sunk as targets
1917 ships